Blora is a regency in the northeastern part of Central Java province in Indonesia. Its capital is Blora. The regency is located in the easternmost part of Central Java, and borders the Goa TerawangBengawan Solo River and the East Java province. It covers an area of 1,820.59 km2 and it had a population of 829,728 at the 2010 census and 884,333 at the 2020 census.

Etymology 
According to a folklore, the word Blora derived from the word belor which means mud. It then evolved into mbeloran, then blora. This folk etymology could partly explain the origin of this name, as the word evolved from Old Javanese instead of the modern belor. See the explanation below.

The word Blora literally means low, watery ground. The name was derived from way and lorah combined (wailorah), which means water and cliff, respectively. During the course of its evolution, the Modern Javanese language evolved voiced plosive [b] from the previous approximant [w] in Old Javanese in the same manner as in Persian. Modern Javanese has also monophthongized Old Javanese "ai" or "ay" into "e", and lost its h's in many places, almost similar to that of French from Latin. Therefore, wailorah became bailorah, then bailora, and finally blora.

History

Duchy of Jipang 
Blora was under the administration of the Duchy of Jipang in the 16th century, which was itself still ruled by the Demak Sultanate at the time. The duke of the duchy was Arya Penangsang, better known as Aria Jipang. The area under control of the duchy include Pati, Lasem, Blora, and Jipang. But, after Joko Tingkir (Hadiwijaya) inherited the throne, the capital was moved into Pajang. After that, Blora was under the Kingdom of Pajang.

Mataram Kingdom 
The Duchy of Jipang did not rule for long, because it was seized by the Mataram Kingdom. Blora was in the eastern part of the kingdom (Bang Wetan). During the reign of Pakubuwono I (1704–1719), Blora was given to his son, Pangeran Blitar, and appointed him as a duke. The area of Blora at that time was 22.5 km2. In 1719–1727, the Mataram Kingdom was led by Amangkurat IV, so Blora was under Amangkurat IV's rule.

War of Mangkubumi 
When Mataram was under the administration of Pakubuwono II (1727–1749), there was a rebellion led by Mangkubumi and Mas Sahid, Mangkubumi succeeded in controlling Sukawati, Grobogan, Demak, Blora, and Yogyakarta. Finally, Mangkubumi was appointed by the people to be a king in Yogyakarta.

Incorporation as a regency 
From the Pajang era to the Mataram era, Blora Regency was an important area for kingdoms. This was because Blora was known for its teak forests. News from Babad Giyanti and Serat Kuntharatama stated that Mangkubumi became a king on 11 December 1749, the day Blora Regency was created. Along with the appointment of Mangkubumi as a king, other officials were also appointed. The leader of the Mangkubumen warriors, Wilatikta, was appointed as the first regent of Blora. Blora's status changed from apanage into a regency on that same day.

Sultanate of Surakarta 
The War of Mangkubumi ended with the Giyanti agreement, in 1755, which was known as palihan negari. Because with this agreement, Mataram was divided into two kingdoms, the Surakarta Sultanate under Paku Buwana III, and Yogyakarta, under Sultan Hamengkubuwono I. In the now-divided kingdom, Blora was in the Surakarta Sultanate as part of the Mancanegara Timur area. However, the regent of Wilatikta did not agree to join the sultanate, so he chose to resign from his position.

Dutch East Indies 
Resistance by the people against the Dutch, which was pioneered by the peasants, emerged in the late 19th and early 20th centuries. It was caused by the worsening social and economic conditions of the rural population at that time. In 1882, a head tax was imposed by the Dutch, which was very burdensome for land owners (farmers). In other areas in Java, tax increases have led to peasant revolts, such as the Cilegon incident in 1888. Two years later, Saminism, a mystical religious sect, rose from the Randublatung region in Blora and Bojonegoro Regency in 1890, and gained prominence in the early 20th century. Headed by a Javanese peasant, Surontiko Samin, it followed the teachings of the Islamic prophet Adam, but owed little to the religion. Stressing the village structure, mysticism, and sexuality, it became an early protest movement, and was opposed to the local rulers as much as it was against the Dutch East Indies colonial administration, refusing to pay the new Dutch head tax. After 1907, many followers were detained and arrested by the Dutch. The movement survived until the 1960s.

During the administrative restructuring of Java during 1925–8, Blora briefly became one half of the new Blora Residency; it was abolished in 1931.

Geography 
Blora Regency consists of both lowland and hilly areas between 20 and 280 metres high above sea level. The northern part of the regency is a hilly area that forms a series of Northern Limestone Mountains as well as in the southern area (Kendeng Mountains) that stretches from east of Semarang to Lamongan (East Java). The capital of Blora Regency is located right on the slope of the Northern Limestone Mountains.

Half of Blora Regency's area is forested, especially on the northern, eastern and southern region, while the central lowland is mainly used for agricultural purposes (rice fields). During the dry season, most of Blora Regency has a water supply shortage, either for drinking or irrigation, especially in limestone and mountainous areas. In the rainy season, several areas are prone to landslides.

Locations

Adjacent regencies 

 Rembang Regency—north
 Tuban Regency, East Java—northeast
 Bojonegoro Regency, East Java—east and southeast
 Ngawi Regency, East Java—south and southwest
 Grobogan Regency—southwest and west
 Pati Regency—northwest

Demographics 
Blora Regency had a population of 884,333 in 2020, an increase of 54,605 since the 2010 census. Almost all of the population is Muslim (98%). The gender ratio in 2019 is 96.85 (males per 100 females).

Administrative districts

Blora Regency is divided into 16 districts or kecamatan, sub-divided into 271 rural villages or desa, and 24 urban villages or kelurahan. Before the division in the 2000s, Blora Regency (at that time the Blora Level II District) was divided into an administrative city, five regent assistants, 19 (nineteen) sub-districts, nine sub-district representatives, 429 rural villages or desa, and 26 urban villages or kelurahan.

Transportation
An inter-provincial road passes through Blora, connecting Semarang, the capital of Central Java, to Surabaya, the capital of East Java via Purwodadi. It's actually the 2nd class road, because most people prefer Semarang-Surabaya via Rembang, due to the wider road there.

Blora is also situated on a southern railway connection that links most big cities in Java. However, Blora's main train station is located in Cepu District. Therefore, people often refer to the Cepu train station. Except for the two above, Blora is just like any other regencies in Java, which has several local public transportation services, such as bemo, becak, etc.

In 2013, expansion and land acquisition was still in progress. Six years after that, the airport reactivation plan was started.

Economy 
Agriculture is the main sector of the economy. In the forestry sub-sector, Blora is one of the main producers of high quality teak wood in Java.

The Cepu area has long been known as an area full of petroleum, which has been exploited since the Dutch East Indies era. Blora received international attention in 2001 when oil reserves of ~250 million barrels were discovered in Cepu. In March 2006, the contract between the government and contractors (PT. Pertamina EP Cepu, Exxon Mobil Cepu Ltd, and PT Ampolex Cepu) was signed, and Exxon Mobil Cepu Ltd.) was appointed as the field operator, in accordance with the Joint Operating Agreement (JOA) of the three contractors. According to the latest developments, the Banyu Urip Field Plan of Development (POD) has been approved by the Minister of Energy and Mineral Resources.

Even though Blora is known for its teak forests and petroleum, which have been managed since the Dutch colonial era to the current Indonesian government, Blora is one of the poorest in Central Java. The ubiquitous natural resources in the regency are not able to raise the standard of living of its people. This is because all of the natural resources benefits the central government and company employees, most of which are outside Blora, without a clear program to improve the economy of the local people.

Places of interest
 Terawang Cave at Todanan district.
 Kantor Pelayanan Pajaka Pratama
 Cepu Forest Railway or Cepu Loko Tour with some Berliner Maschinenbau steam locomotives from Berlin, Germany, Central Europe at Ngelo, Cepu district.
 Tempuran reservoir in Blora City
 Greneng reservoir in Tunjungan
 Blora City Park in Blora City
 Sarbini Park or Water Splash in Blora City
 Tirtonadi Park in Blora City
 Sculpture Satay Park in Gagaan Village, Kunduran District
 Thousand Lights Park in Cepu City
 Samin Village in Klopodhuwur Village, Kunduran District
 Bentolo reservoir in Todanan
 Randhakuning reservoir in Muraharjo Village, Kunduran District
 Spring vegetables in Soko Village
 Pencu Hill in Bogorejo District
 Manggir Mountain in Ngumbul Village

Culture

Arts and festivals 
Barongan Gembong Amijoyo is carried out in village and family agendas, such as sedekah bumi. It is performed either with or without a storyline.

Tayub Blora is often held in various agendas in Blora, usually held at weddings. In addition, Tayub Blora is often performed in annual village agendas. To preserve the culture of Blora, the local government held the Tayub Nusantara Festival at Tirtonadi Blora Park.

Kadrohan or Terangan in Blora comes from districts that have a strong santri culture. It is growing rapidly in the Blora and Ngawen subdistrict. It is usually performed to fill recitation events, circumcisions and weddings. There are two types of Kadrohan, traditional and modern. Traditional hadro does not use melodic instruments. In the middle of the performance, the narration of Berjanjen or Manaqib Syeh Abdul Qodir Jailani is usually read.

Karawitan is a traditional music that is often performed at weddings. The purpose is to entertain guests at weddings with Javanese music. The main instrument is a set of gamelan.

Notable people
 Tirto Adhi Soerjo, journalist and founder of Medan Prijaji.
 Pramoedya Ananta Toer, Indonesian writer (The main character of his novel, Buru quartet is based on Tirto Adhi Soerjo).
 Leonardus Benjamin Moerdani, former ABRI Commander from 1983 to 1988 and former Indonesia's Minister of Defense and Security.
 Maria Rahajeng, Miss Indonesia 2014 and represented Indonesia at Miss World 2014 (top 25).
 Pratama Arhan, Indonesian footballer who play for Tokyo Verdy and the Indonesia national team.

References

External links

 

 
Solo River